"Burbujas de Amor" ("Love Bubbles") is a song by Dominican singer-songwriter Juan Luis Guerra, released as the third single of his album Bachata Rosa (1990). It is widely considered one of Guerra's most popular songs. The song was a commercial success and became an international hit in Europe and Latin America. It peaked at number 2 on the Hot Latin Songs chart. The track received universal acclaim from critics and was praised for its sophisticated lyrics and elegance. 

In 1990, Burbujas de Amor was rated 8th of the Top Hot Latin Tracks in the United States by Billboard magazine. It was named Song of the Year of 1990 by Billboard's Latin music critics. The song won Tropical/Salsa Song of the Year at Premios Lo Nuestro 1991. In 2015, it was placed 8th on Billboard's Top 50 Best Latin Songs of All Time. It was listed at number 21 on Rolling Stone's list of 50 Greatest Latin Pop Songs in 2018.

Track listing 

 Burbujas de Amor - 4:09
 A Pedir Su Mano - 4:54

Charts

See also 
List of number-one hits of 1991 (Mexico)

References 

1990 songs
Juan Luis Guerra songs
Songs written by Juan Luis Guerra
1990 singles